This is a list of ballet companies in the United States. It includes only professional companies that are currently in business.

See also
 List of dance companies

Footnotes

United States, List of Ballet Companies in the
 Companies in the United States, List of Ballet